Gerard Badía Cortés (born 18 October 1989) is a Spanish footballer who plays for FC Ascó as a midfielder.

He spent his professional career with Guadalajara and Piast Gliwice, winning the Ekstraklasa with the latter club.

Club career
Born in Horta de Sant Joan, Province of Tarragona, Catalonia, Badía all but spent his career in his country in the lower leagues. The exception to this was in the 2011–12 and 2012–13 seasons, when he appeared for CD Guadalajara in the Segunda División.

Badía signed with Polish club Piast Gliwice in February 2014, from SD Noja. He made his Ekstraklasa debut on the 17th, coming on as a late substitute in a 0–1 home loss against Wisła Kraków.

In the 2018–19 campaign, Badía contributed 21 matches and two goals as Piast won the first national championship in their 74-year history. During his spell at the Stadion Miejski, he made more than 200 competitive appearances.

Badía returned to both Catalonia and amateur football on 14 July 2021, with the 31-year-old joining FC Ascó.

Career statistics

Honours
Piast Gliwice
Ekstraklasa: 2018–19

References

External links

1989 births
Living people
People from Terra Alta (comarca)
Sportspeople from the Province of Tarragona
Spanish footballers
Footballers from Catalonia
Association football midfielders
Segunda División players
Segunda División B players
Tercera División players
Divisiones Regionales de Fútbol players
CF Gavà players
Real Murcia Imperial players
CD Guadalajara (Spain) footballers
Ekstraklasa players
Piast Gliwice players
Spanish expatriate footballers
Expatriate footballers in Poland
Spanish expatriate sportspeople in Poland
FC Ascó players